KSTA 1000 AM is a radio station licensed to Coleman, Texas. The station airs a country music format and is owned by Tackett-Boazman Broadcasting LP.

References

External links
KSTA's official website

Country radio stations in the United States
STA
STA